Gerd Zimmermann (26 September 1949 – 6 April 2022) was a German footballer. He spent nine seasons in the Bundesliga with Borussia Mönchengladbach, SC Fortuna Köln and Fortuna Düsseldorf. He spent two years in the North American Soccer League playing for the Houston Hurricane and the Calgary Boomers before returning to Germany to close out his career.

Honours
Borussia Mönchengladbach
 Bundesliga: 1969–70

Fortuna Düsseldorf
 European Cup Winners' Cup finalist: 1978–79
 DFB-Pokal: 1978–79, 1979–80; runner-up 1977–78

Fortuna Köln
 DFB-Pokal: runner-up 1982–83

References

External links
 
 NASL stats

1949 births
2022 deaths
People from Rhein-Kreis Neuss
Sportspeople from Düsseldorf (region)
German footballers
Association football defenders
Association football midfielders
Bundesliga players
North American Soccer League (1968–1984) players
North American Soccer League (1968–1984) indoor players
Borussia Mönchengladbach players
SC Fortuna Köln players
Fortuna Düsseldorf players
SG Union Solingen players
Calgary Boomers players
Houston Hurricane players
West German expatriate footballers
West German expatriate sportspeople in the United States
Expatriate soccer players in the United States
Footballers from North Rhine-Westphalia
West German expatriate sportspeople in Canada
Expatriate soccer players in Canada
West German footballers